The Saab 21R was a Swedish fighter/attack aircraft developed and produced by Svenska Aeroplan AB (SAAB). It was a jet-powered development of the piston-engined SAAB 21 and was the first jet aircraft to be produced by Saab. The R-suffix stands for reaktion (reaction), referencing reaktionsdrift (jet power) or reaktionsmotor (jet engine). Along with the Soviet Yakovlev Yak-15, the 21R was one of only two jet fighters to have been successfully converted from piston-powered aircraft.

Sweden was under threat during the Second World War, and ordered SAAB to develop an advanced fighter. The result was an unorthodox twin-boom pusher, with a low wing, tricycle landing gear, and a heavy forward-firing armament. Several options were then explored to improve its performance, leading to a jet-powered version.

During 1947, SAAB began converting the piston-engined J 21s to jet propulsion, which required  extensive modifications. 124 aircraft were planned, however this was reduced to 64 and they were instead mainly used as fighter-bombers. It saw service in the late 1940s and early 1950s before it was replaced by a new generation of fighters designed from the onset with jet propulsion, such as the de Havilland Vampire and the Saab 29 Tunnan.

Design and development

Background
During the early stages of the Second World War, Sweden was concerned that its neutrality and its independence could be threatened by one of the belligerent powers, and so enacted a series of emergency measures to increase its military's preparedness and deterrence value against potential aggressors. Between 1939 and 1941, the Swedish Air Force committed itself to a major expansion programme, which included the procurement of large numbers of foreign and locally developed fighters. As a consequence of the conflict, few nations possessed available production capacity or a willingness to supply modern fighters to Sweden, being a relatively small neutral country. While Sweden's own domestic production capability would be insufficient until at least 1943, Sweden would have to develop its own first-rate designs to meet its needs.

In 1941, in response to Swedish Air Force requirements, the Swedish aviation company SAAB commenced work on a radical new fighter. The company envisioned an unorthodox twin-boom pusher configuration fighter aircraft, featuring a low wing, a tricycle landing gear, and with a heavy forward-firing armament. It was powered by a licensed version of the new German Daimler-Benz DB 605B inline piston engine, which was refined and built by Svenska Flygmotor AB. The Swedish Air Force designated it the J 21, and a prototype was flown on 30 July 1943.

By 1945, options were being explored to improve its performance. Many of these involved the substitution of the 605B engine with a more powerful powerplant. Other projects, such as the SAAB 27, were intended to use the Griffon as well, but the end of the year, all work on piston-engine design was abandoned.

In parallel with the piston-engine studies, SAAB and other Swedish companies had been evaluating a new type of engine - the jet engine. Two early studies, RX 1 and RX 2, had been studied, both of which being twin-boom aircraft similar to the 21. Recognising the Swedish Air Force's enthusiasm  for a jet-powered aircraft for late 1945, SAAB decided to produce a version of the 21 harnessing jet propulsion. A design study was initiated for converting the J 21A to jet power. It was recognized that Sweden would otherwise be left behind while nations such as the United Kingdom already had the Gloster Meteor and de Havilland Vampire in production.

The design study was proceeding in late 1945 despite no specific engine having been chosen, but the opportunity came up to purchase a license to manufacture the "Goblin 2" turbojet engine in Sweden. This was the first jet engine to be used by the Swedish Air Force, who designated it as the RM1. The first flight of Saab's first jet aircraft, a converted J 21, was on 10 March 1947, powered with a single Goblin 2 engine. The results of the flight test programme were largely satisfactory.

Conversion programme

During 1947, SAAB began to receive piston-engined J 21s to convert them to jet propulsion. This requiring each aircraft to be extensively modified. In all, in over 50 per cent of the airframe, tailplane and wing was changed and, each of them was equipped with a single British-sourced de Havilland Goblin turbojet engine, which replaced the DB 605B and propeller unit. It became the Swedish Air Force's first jet aircraft. In light of the extensive changes, rebuilt 21s were redesignated J 21R.

Many changes were made to accommodate the Goblin engine, which had considerably different properties and requirements than the DB 605B engine. The horizontal stabilizer had to be raised to clear the jet engine's exhaust, which required that the tail section be redesigned. Additionally, to feed the thirsty turbojet, the fuel capacity was increased significantly with additional tanks in the wing centre section and wingtip tanks. The fighter's aerodynamics were improved during the rebuild, with a curved windscreen, and a modified wing leading edge. Air brakes were added as an additional flap on the outer wing's trailing edge. The ejection seat, which was a relatively new innovation, received various improvements that enabled it to eject as higher speeds.

The A 21R attack version could now carry  ground attack rockets installed underneath the wing centre section. An alternative external paddan (toad) gun pod could be mounted under the wing centre section instead of the rockets. The paddan pod contained eight  ksp m/22 machine guns with 800 rounds of ammunition per gun. The fire control system allowed all installed guns and all the rockets or the gunpod to be fired at once.

A production run of 124 aircraft was planned, including four prototypes. When F 10 wing had gained experience with the type, it was concluded that all of the aircraft were to be attack aircraft and the production batch was reduced to 64 aircraft. Of these, 34 fighters were designated J 21RA, powered by the  Goblin 2 engine, or RM1 in Sweden. These were later re-designated as A 21RA. The remaining 30 were designated A 21RB. These were powered by a Swedish-built  Goblin 3 or RM1A engine.

Operational history
The first prototype Saab 21R first flew on 10 March 1947, almost 2 years after the Second World War. The aircraft first entered service with F 10 in August 1950. Although the type was intended as a fighter aircraft, the Saab J 29 was flying by October 1948, so the order was reduced to 60, and all 21Rs were eventually converted to attack aircraft as A 21RA or A 21RB depending on the engine type.

Variants
J 21RA / A 21RA
First production series, powered by British-built engines, 34 built in 1950 (including four prototypes), retired in 1953.
A 21RB
Second production series, powered by Swedish-built engines, 30 built between 1950 and 1952, retired in 1956.

Operators

 Swedish Air Force
 F7 Såtenäs, 1950–54: A21RA/B
 F10 Ängelholm, 1949–51: J21RA
 F17 Kallinge, 1954–56: A21RA/B

Surviving aircraft

No original examples survived after being taken out of service, however, in the 1990s a group of volunteers took a surviving derelict Saab 21 airframe and rebuilt it into a 21R for display at the Swedish Air Force Museum.

Specifications (Saab 21RA)

See also

References

Bibliography
 Andersson, Hans G. Saab Aircraft since 1937, 1st ed. London: Putnam, 1989. .
 Billing, Peter. "Saab's Jet Debutant". Air Enthusiast, No. 23, December 1983 – March 1984. . 
 Cattaneo, Gianni. The Fiat CR.42 (Aircraft in Profile number 170). Leatherhead, Surrey, UK: Profile Publications, 1967. No ISBN.
 Erichs, Rolph, Kai Hammerich, Gudmund Rapp et al. The Saab-Scania Story. Stockholm: Streiffert & Co., 1988. .

 Sharpe, Michael. Attack and Interceptor Jets. London: Friedman/Fairfax Publishers, 1999. .
 Widfeldt, Bo. The Saab 21 A & R (Aircraft in Profile number 138).  Leatherhead, Surrey, UK: Profile Publications, 1966.

External links

 J.21R in the Air - a 1948 Flight article on flying the SAAB J.21R

21R
1940s Swedish fighter aircraft
Twin-boom aircraft
Single-engined jet aircraft
Aircraft first flown in 1947
Low-wing aircraft